Edwin Jack Fisher (August 10, 1928 – September 22, 2010) was an American singer and actor. He was one of the most popular artists during the 1950s, selling millions of records and hosting his own TV show, The Eddie Fisher Show. Actress Elizabeth Taylor was best friends with Fisher's first wife, actress Debbie Reynolds. After Taylor's third husband, Mike Todd, was killed in a plane crash, Fisher divorced Reynolds and he and Taylor married that same year. The scandalous affair that Fisher and Taylor had been having while each were already married was widely reported and brought unfavorable publicity to both Fisher and Taylor. Approximately five years later, he and Taylor divorced and he later married Connie Stevens. Fisher is the father of Carrie Fisher and Todd Fisher, whose mother is Reynolds, and the father of Joely Fisher and Tricia Leigh Fisher, whose mother is Stevens.

Early life
Fisher was born in Philadelphia on August 10, 1928, the fourth of seven children born to Gitte Kathrine "Kate" Tisch (née Minicker, later Stup; b.  1901; d. 1991) and Joseph Fisher (né Tisch; 1900–1972), both Jewish immigrants from the Russian Empire. His father's surname was originally Tisch, but was changed to Fisher by the time of the 1940 census. To his family, Fisher was always called "Sonny Boy", a nickname derived from the song of the same name in Al Jolson's film The Singing Fool (1928). His siblings were Sidney, Nettie, Miriam, Janet, Alvin, and Eileen. Kate and Joseph divorced when Fisher was an adult, after 33 years of marriage, and Kate married Max Stup.

Fisher attended Thomas Junior High School, South Philadelphia High School, and Simon Gratz High School. It was known at an early age that he had talent as a vocalist, and he started singing in numerous amateur contests, which he usually won. He made his radio debut on WFIL, a local Philadelphia radio station. He also performed on Arthur Godfrey's Talent Scouts, a popular radio show that later moved to television. Because he became a local star, Fisher dropped out of high school in the middle of his senior year to pursue his career.

Career
By 1946, Fisher was crooning with the bands of Buddy Morrow and Charlie Ventura. He was heard in 1949 by Eddie Cantor at Grossinger's Catskill Resort Hotel in the Borscht Belt. Cantor's so-called discovery of Fisher was later described as a totally contrived, "manipulated' arrangement by Milton Blackstone, Grossinger's publicity director. After performing on Cantor's radio show he was an instant hit and gained nationwide exposure. He then signed a recording contract with RCA Victor.

Fisher was drafted into the U.S. Army in 1951, sent to Fort Hood, Texas, for basic training, and served a year in Korea. From 1952 to 1953, he was the official vocal soloist for The United States Army Band (Pershing's Own) and a tenor section member in the United States Army Band Chorus (an element of Pershing's Own) assigned at Fort Myer in the Washington, D.C. Military District. During his active duty period, he also made occasional guest television appearances, in uniform, introduced as "PFC Eddie Fisher". After his discharge, he began to sing in top nightclubs and had a variety television series, Coke Time with Eddie Fisher on NBC (1953–1957). Fisher also appeared on The Perry Como Show, Club Oasis, The Martha Raye Show, The Gisele MacKenzie Show, The Chesterfield Supper Club and The George Gobel Show, and starred in another series, The Eddie Fisher Show (NBC) (1957–1959, alternating with Gobel's series).

Fisher's good looks and strong, melodious tenor voice made him a teen idol and one of the most popular singers of the early 1950s. He had 17 songs in the Top 10 on the music charts between 1950 and 1956 and 35 in the Top 40. In 1957 he signed a then record $1 million deal with the newly opened Tropicana Las Vegas to appear there a minimum of 4 weeks a year for 5 years.

In 1956, Fisher costarred with then-wife Debbie Reynolds in the musical comedy Bundle of Joy. He played a dramatic role in the 1960 drama Butterfield 8 with second wife Elizabeth Taylor. His best friend was showman and producer Mike Todd, who died in a plane crash in 1958. Fisher's affair, divorce from Reynolds, and subsequent marriage to Taylor, Todd's widow, caused a show business scandal. Due to the unfavorable publicity surrounding the affair and divorce, NBC canceled Fisher's television series in March 1959.

Beginning in fall 1959, he established two scholarships at Brandeis University, one for classical and one for popular music, in the name of Eddie Cantor.

In 1960, RCA Victor dropped him and he briefly recorded on his own label, Ramrod Records. He later recorded for Dot Records. During this time, he had the first commercial recording of "Sunrise, Sunset" from Fiddler on the Roof. This technically counts as the biggest standard Fisher can claim credit for introducing, although it is rarely associated with him. He also recorded the albums Eddie Fisher Today and Young and Foolish (both 1965). The Dot contract was not successful in record sales terms, and he returned to RCA Victor and had a minor single hit in 1966 with the song "Games That Lovers Play" with Nelson Riddle, which became the title of his best selling album. When Fisher was at the height of his popularity, in the mid-1950s, singles, rather than albums, were the primary medium for issuing recordings. His last album for RCA Victor was an Al Jolson tribute, You Ain't Heard Nothin' Yet, released in 1968. In 1983 he attempted a comeback tour but this was not a success. Eddie Fisher's last released album was recorded around 1984 on the Bainbridge record label. Fisher tried to stop the album from being released, but it turned up as After All. The album was produced by William J. O'Malley and arranged by Angelo DiPippo. DiPippo, a world-renowned arranger, worked with Eddie countless hours to better his vocals but it became useless. His final recordings (never released) were made in 1995 with the London Philharmonic Orchestra. According to arranger-conductor Vincent Falcone in his 2005 autobiography, Frankly: Just Between Us, these tracks were "the best singing of his life". Fisher performed in top concert halls all over the United States and headlined in major Las Vegas showrooms. He headlined at the Palace Theater in New York City as well as London's Palladium. In the culmination of his return to the concert stage in 1962, Fisher headlined a five-week Broadway show at Winter Garden, calling it a dream of his since youth to perform in the venue Al Jolson had made famous.

Fisher created interest as a pop culture icon. Betty Johnson's "I Want Eddie Fisher For Christmas", containing references to a number of hit songs, reached No. 28 in the Music Vendor national survey during an 11-week chart run in late 1954.

Fisher has two stars on the Hollywood Walk of Fame, one for recording, at 6241 Hollywood Boulevard, and one for television, at 1724 Vine Street.

Personal life

Fisher had five marriages and four children:
Debbie Reynolds (m. 1955–div. 1959)
Carrie Fisher (b. 1956–d. 2016)
Todd Fisher (b. 1958)
Elizabeth Taylor (m. 1959–div. 1964)
Connie Stevens (m. 1967–div. 1969)
Joely Fisher (b. 1967)
Tricia Leigh Fisher (b. 1968)
Terry Richard (m. 1975–div. 1976)
Betty Lin (m. 1993 – April 15, 2001; her death)

In 1981, Fisher wrote an autobiography, Eddie: My Life, My Loves. He wrote another autobiography in 1999 titled Been There, Done That. The latter book devotes little space to Fisher's singing career, but recycled the material of his first book and added many new sexual details that were too strong to publish before. Upon the book's publication, his daughter Carrie declared: "I'm thinking of having my DNA fumigated."

While performing at The Tropicana Hotel in 1957, Fisher had numerous affairs with women which contributed to his turbulent marriage to Debbie Reynolds. One of his notable affairs was with model Pat Sheehan. They eventually parted ways after Fisher refused to divorce Reynolds. He would divorce Reynolds two years later and marry Elizabeth Taylor.

When she was interviewed, Debbie Reynolds said that she could understand being dumped "for the world's most beautiful woman", referring to Taylor, who was previously a close friend. Taylor and Reynolds later resumed their friendship and mocked Fisher in a TV movie written by Carrie Fisher, These Old Broads, in which their characters ridiculed the ex-husband they shared, named "Freddie Hunter".

In his memoirs, Fisher admitted to addictions to drugs and gambling, which aggravated his career problems.

Fisher supported Lyndon B. Johnson in the 1964 United States presidential election.

Death
Fisher suffered from knee, back, hearing, and eyesight problems in his later years, the last of which were worsened by complications stemming from cataract removal surgery, and he rarely appeared in public. According to friends, he remained mentally vigorous and kept himself busy watching television, following news and politics, and singing his old songs while friend George Michalski played the piano. Michalski had worked on several occasions over the years to help Fisher get his name back on the music charts. He said "The '60s passed Eddie by; he missed that entire era of music. I'd play a Beatles song like "Something" for him and he'd think I wrote it."

Fisher fell and broke his hip on September 9, 2010, and died 13 days later on September 22, 2010, at his home in Berkeley, California, from complications from hip surgery, at the age of 82. His ashes were interred at Cypress Lawn Memorial Park next to his wife Betty Lin who died in 2001.

Discography

Hit songs

Albums
Eddie Fisher Sings (10-inch album) (RCA Victor 1952)
I'm in the Mood for Love (RCA Victor 1952/55)
Christmas with Eddie Fisher (10-inch album) (RCA Victor 1952)
Eddie Fisher Sings Irving Berlin Favorites (10-inch album) (RCA Victor 1954)
May I Sing to You? (RCA Victor 1954/55)
I Love You (RCA Victor 1955)
Eddie Fisher Sings Academy Award Winning Songs (RCA Victor 1955)
Bundle of Joy (film soundtrack) (RCA Victor 1956)
As Long as There's Music (RCA Victor 1958)
Scent of Mystery (film soundtrack) (Ramrod 1960)
Eddie Fisher at the Winter Garden (Ramrod 1963)
Eddie Fisher Today! (Dot 1965)
When I Was Young (Dot 1965) (re-recordings of his RCA Victor hits)
Mary Christmas (Dot 1965)
Games That Lovers Play (RCA Victor 1966)
People Like You (RCA Victor 1967)
You Ain't Heard Nothing Yet (RCA Victor 1968)
After All (Bainbridge Records 1984)

Compilations
Thinking of You (RCA Victor 1957)
Eddie Fisher's Greatest Hits (RCA Victor 1962)
The Very Best of Eddie Fisher (MCA 1988)
All Time Greatest Hits Vol.1 (RCA 1990)
Eddie Fisher – Greatest Hits (RCA 2001)

Books
Fisher, Eddie (1984). Eddie: My Life, My Loves. Harper Collins. .
Fisher, Eddie; Fisher, David (1999).Been There, Done That.

References

External links

Thinking Of You: Eddie Fisher on The Interlude Era site
Obituary, The New York Times
Eddie Fisher: Life and Times  – slideshow by Life magazine

|-
!colspan="3" style="background:#C1D8FF;"| Husband of Elizabeth Taylor

1928 births
2010 deaths
United States Army personnel of the Korean War
American crooners
American male film actors
American male pop singers
American people of Russian-Jewish descent
Burials at Cypress Lawn Memorial Park
Dot Records artists
Jewish American male actors
Jewish American musicians
Jewish singers
Musicians from Philadelphia
RCA Victor artists
Singers from Pennsylvania
Traditional pop music singers
United States Army soldiers
21st-century American Jews